Sandel may refer to:

 Mount Sandel Mesolithic site, a mesolithic site and an ancient fort in County Londonderry, Northern Ireland
 Sandel, a novel by Angus John Mackintosh Stewart
 Aïn Sandel, town in Algeria

People
 Ari Sandel (born 1974), director and co-writer of 2005 Oscar-winning comedy short "West Bank Story"
 Cora Sandel (1880–1974), Norwegian writer who lived most of her life in France and Sweden
 Jean Mary Sandel (1916–1974), surgeon
 Jerry Sandel (born 1942), American politician 
 Józef Sandel (1894–1962), art critic
 Michael J. Sandel (born 1953), political philosopher
 Warren Sandel (1921–1993), professional baseball player

See also
 Sandal (disambiguation)
 Sandell, a surname
 Johan August Sandels, a Swedish nobleman